The Jamaica International Reggae Film Festival is a unique annual event which takes place each year in Kingston, Jamaica, first held in 2008 and held each year since then.

The Reggae Film Festival is coordinated by film maker and film festival organizer Barbara Blake Hannah, former Special Tasks Consultant to the Minister of Culture in collaboration with Peter Gittins of Reggae Films UK to give Jamaicans the opportunity to view some of the best of the hundreds of films made about and because of the world-famous music of Jamaica, that not only reflect the wide interest in Jamaican music, but also bring tourists on vacation and income to members of the entertainment fraternity, as well as the nation.

The Reggae Film Festival is intended as the foundation activity of a Jamaica Film Academy that will archive films for research, screening and education. The Jamaica Film Academy aims to preserve all moving images relating to Jamaica and its musical past.

The festival shows films relating to reggae which are made each year all over the globe, it is a place for Reggae fans to come together each year to watch the latest reggae related films and a place for members of the film industry to link up with each other. International films on non-reggae topics are welcomed and shown annually.

See also
 List of reggae festivals
 Reggae

References

External links 
Official Reggae Film Festival website

Reggae Film Festival 2008 Day 3 Pictures
Newspaper Article
Newspaper Article
Newspaper Article

Film festivals in Jamaica
Film festivals established in 2008
Reggae festivals in Jamaica